Glenstal Abbey is a Roman Catholic Benedictine monastery of the Congregation of the Annunciation located in Murroe, County Limerick, Ireland. It is dedicated to Saint Joseph and Saint Columba. The current abbot of the monastery is Brendan Coffey.

History 
The abbey is located in and beside Glenstal Castle, a Normanesque castle. The house was built for Sir Matthew Barrington, who, in 1818, purchased part of Lord Carbery's Limerick estate. Designed as a castle in 12th century style, it was built in the 1830s. The village of Glenstal grew from the construction of the abbey. Many of the builders and craftsmen who came to construct the Abbey ended up settling in the area. 

Sir Charles Burton Barrington, 5th Baronet inherited the estate from his father in 1890. In 1921, his daughter, Winifred, was killed in an IRA ambush of a Royal Irish Constabulary inspector with whom she was traveling. The family then decided to relocate to Fairthorne Manor in Hampshire, England.

Barrington first offered the property to the Irish Free State for a presidential residence, but in light of the anticipated cost of maintenance, the government declined. In 1925, at the suggestion of Fr Richard Devane, professor at St Patrick’s College, Thurles and John Harty, Archbishop of Cashel and Emly, Monsignor James J. Ryan, retired president of St. Patrick's College, purchased the estate from the family with the intent to establish a Benedictine school there.

The abbey came into being in 1927 when the chapter of Maredsous Abbey in Belgium accepted the Ryan's offer to donate the estate for a monastery there. Later that year a superior, Fr. Bernard O’Dea, was appointed and the founding monks were chosen. They arrived in Glenstal in May 1927. The abbey was canonically erected on 18 December 1927. The monks became legal owners of the estate in January 1928 after receiving the deeds. The monastery runs an all-boys boarding secondary school on its grounds, Glenstal Abbey School, home to approximately two hundred students.

Like many other religious organisations, Glenstal Abbey was faced with allegations of child abuse. Since 1975 ten accusations against six monks were filed. In a 2014 report The National Board for Safeguarding Children (NBSC) stated that the Benedictine community handled these accusations well with proper action, including removal from monastic life and treatment.

The abbey released commercial Gregorian chant albums in the late 1990s as The Monks of Glenstal Abbey, also contributing to the multi-platinum-selling Faith of our Fathers in 1996. The monks of Glenstal Abbey, feature as part of the interval act during the 1995 Eurovision Song Contest, in Dublin, Lumen, composed by Mícheál Ó Súilleabháin who has a long association with the Abbey.

Grounds 
The picturesque grounds include lakes, forests and an old walled, terraced garden which features a "bible garden". From 1986 Dr. Brian P. Murphy osb worked with volunteers, restoring the gardens, he also published a book in 2004 on the history of Glenstal Abbey Gardens. It also runs a 250-acre dairy farm.

Abbots / Priors 
Currently, Abbots are elected for an eight-year period. Before 1957, the superior had the title of prior. From 1927 until 1945 the prior was appointed by the parent abbey Maredsous in Belgium.
 Prior Bede Lebbe OSB (to 1938)
 Prior Idesbald Ryelandt OSB (1938–1945)
 Prior Bernard O’Dea OSB (1945–1952) 
 Prior Placid Murray OSB DD (1952–1957)
 Abbot Joseph Dowdall OSB (1957–1966)
 Abbot Agustine O'Sullivan OSB (1966–1980)
 Abbot Celestine Cullen OSB (1980–1992)
 Abbot Christopher Dillon OSB (1992–2008)
 Abbot Mark Patrick Hederman OSB (2008–2016)
 Abbot Brendan Coffey OSB (2016–)

See also
 List of abbeys and priories in Ireland (County Limerick)

References

External links
 Official Abbey Website
 Official School Website

Boys' schools in the Republic of Ireland
Benedictine monasteries in the Republic of Ireland
Buildings and structures in County Limerick
Religion in County Limerick